Teerandaz is a 1955 Indian film directed by H. S. Rawail and starring Ajit and Madhubala.

Plot 
The Story revolves around the life of a Kind-Hearted and brave man living with his family and fells in love with a Princess- A Sweet and simple girl and wanted to marry her. However, he changes his life to a Fearless Archer after noticing the injustice by her Father and revolted against him, and rescues people from danger.

Cast 
The main cast of the film included:
Ajit
Madhubala
Jairaj
Chandrashekhar
Gope
Helen
Kuldip Kaur
M. H. Douglas
Yashodhara Katju 
Chanchal
Sunder
Randhir
Mohana

Songs 
The songs were composed by C. Ramchandra, the film has 6 songs, all sung by Lata Mangeshkar.

References

External links 
 

1955 films
1950s Hindi-language films
Indian black-and-white films